"Laura" is a 1945 popular song. The music, composed by David Raksin for the 1944 movie Laura, which starred Gene Tierney and Dana Andrews, is heard frequently in the movie. The film's director, Otto Preminger, had originally wanted to use Duke Ellington's "Sophisticated Lady" as the theme, but Raksin was not convinced that it was suitable. Angered, Preminger gave Raksin one weekend to compose an alternative melody. Raksin later said, and maintained for the rest of his days, that when, over that weekend, his wife sent him a "Dear John" letter, the haunting theme seemed to write itself.

The lyrics were written by Johnny Mercer after the film made the tune popular, so he had to title the song "Laura". According to Mercer, he had not yet seen the movie when he wrote the lyrics but was aware that it was a romantic, somewhat haunting story.
Laura is the face in the misty light, footsteps that you hear down the hall
The laugh that floats on the summer night that you can never quite recall
And you see Laura on a train that is passing through, those eyes how familiar they seem
She gave your very first kiss to you, that was Laura but she's only a dream

The song became a jazz standard and has been recorded over 400 times. Some of the best-known versions are by Woody Herman, Dave Brubeck, Johnny Johnston, Emil Newman, David Rose, Billy Eckstine, Charlie Parker, J. J. Johnson, Carly Simon, Frank Sinatra, Spike Jones and Julie London (included on her 1955 debut album Julie Is Her Name, Vol. 1). The first 10 notes of the song are sometimes "quoted" during jazz solos, especially since Dizzy Gillespie did it during his "Perdido" solo at the Massey Hall concert in May 1953.

Some notable recordings
Emil Newman (first performance, 11 Oct. 1944)
Erroll Garner (1945)
Don Byas (1945)
Woody Herman – "Laura" / "I Wonder" (shellac, 1945)
Johnny Johnston (1945)
Eric Winstone and His Band Song: Alan Lane. Recorded in London on June 6, 1945. It was released by EMI on the HMV Records label as catalogue number BD 5893
Stan Kenton (1946)
Sidney Bechet (1947)
David Rose (1947)
Frank Sinatra (1947)
Dave Brubeck (trio, 1949)
Charlie Parker – Charlie Parker with Strings (1950)
Nat King Cole - Penthouse Serenade (1952)
Dave Brubeck – Jazz at the College of the Pacific (quartet, 1953)
Clifford Brown – Clifford Brown with Strings (1955)
Lenny Dee - Dee-Lightful! (1955)
Julie London - Julie Is Her Name (1955)
Charles Mingus - Mingus Three (1957)
Coleman Hawkins - The Hawk Flies High (1957)
Frank Sinatra – Where Are You? (1957)
Tony Bennett - To My Wonderful One (1960)
Dorothy Ashby - Soft Winds (1961)
Eric Dolphy – From In Europe, Vol. 2 (1961)
Percy Faith – orchestral version from the album A Summer Place (1961)
Al Hirt – He's the King and His Band (1961)
Sergio Franchi – Women in My Life (1964)
Jeanne Lee and Ran Blake – The Newest Sound Around (1962) 
Ella Fitzgerald – Ella Fitzgerald Sings the Johnny Mercer Songbook (1964)
Andy Williams – The Academy Award-Winning "Call Me Irresponsible" and Other Hit Songs from the Movies (1964)
Trini Lopez – From his album The Love Album (1965)
Bill Evans – A Simple Matter of Conviction (1966)
Harry James - Laura (Harmony HS 11326, 1969)
David Raksin with the New Philharmonia Orchestra (1975)
Dexter Gordon – Sophisticated Giant (1977)
Rosemary Clooney - Sings The Lyrics Of Johnny Mercer (1987)
Spike Jones – Thank You Music Lovers! (1960)
Royce Campbell – The Art Of Chord Solo Guitar (1994)
Billy Eckstine – Everything I Have Is Yours (album) (1995)
The Four Freshmen - Great Gentlemen of Song / Spotlight On The Four Freshmen (1995)
Dick Haymes – The Very Best of Dick Haymes (1997)
Carly Simon – Film Noir (1998)
Mina – L'allieva (2005)
Robert Wyatt / Gilad Atzmon /  Ros Stephen] – ......... For the Ghosts Within (2010)
Seth MacFarlane – Music Is Better Than Words (2011)
Earl Klugh – Late Night Guitar'' (1980)

References

Film theme songs
1945 songs
Songs with music by David Raksin
Songs with lyrics by Johnny Mercer
Songs written for films
Ella Fitzgerald songs
Trini Lopez songs
Frank Sinatra songs
Al Hirt songs
Andy Williams songs
Songs about fictional female characters